Carleton East was an electoral riding in Ontario, Canada. It was created for the 1967 election and was abolished in 1999 into Carleton—Gloucester and Ottawa—Vanier.

From 1986 until its abolition in 1998, the riding included most of the (now former) City of Gloucester, except the area north of Leitrim Road between Limebank Road and Conroy Road and the area north of the Queensway and west of Blair Road. Carleton East also included the (now former) Village of Rockcliffe Park and the City of Ottawa north of Montreal Road and east of Rockcliffe Park.

Members of Provincial Parliament

Election results

References

 

Former provincial electoral districts of Ontario